Jennifer Whiteside is a Canadian politician and trade unionist who was elected to the Legislative Assembly of British Columbia in the 2020 British Columbia general election. She represents the electoral district of New Westminster as a member of the British Columbia New Democratic Party (BC NDP). She has served in the cabinet of British Columbia since 2020, currently as Minister of Mental Health and Addictions.

Biography
Born and raised in New Westminster, Whiteside went to New Westminster Secondary School before finishing secondary studies at Burnaby South. She then attended Douglas College before enrolling at Simon Fraser University, graduating with a degree in history. 

Prior to entering politics, Whiteside held a variety of positions within the labour movement. She had worked as a researcher with the Hospital Employees' Union (HEU) in BC, the Canadian Union of Public Employees and the Conseil provincial des affaires sociales in Quebec, before re-joining the HEU in 2015 as secretary-business manager, also covering duties including chief spokesperson and lead negotiator.

With incumbent Member of the Legislative Assembly (MLA) for New Westminster Judy Darcy declining to seek re-election in 2020, Whiteside decided to contest the BC NDP nomination for the riding. After securing the nomination, she was elected MLA for New Westminster on October 24, 2020 with 60% of the popular vote.

On November 26, 2020, Whiteside was appointed Minister of Education in the second cabinet of Premier John Horgan. On December 7, 2022 she was named Minister of Mental Health and Addictions by Premier David Eby.

Election results

References

External links
Legislative Assembly of British Columbia - Jennifer Whiteside

21st-century Canadian politicians
21st-century Canadian women politicians
British Columbia New Democratic Party MLAs
Women government ministers of Canada
Members of the Executive Council of British Columbia
Women MLAs in British Columbia
Living people
Year of birth missing (living people)
Education ministers of British Columbia
People from New Westminster
Simon Fraser University alumni